Calgary South was a provincial electoral district in Calgary, Alberta, Canada from 1963 to 1971. The district was one of 63 districts in 1963, and 65 in 1967, mandated to return a single member to the Legislative Assembly of Alberta using the first past the post method of voting.

History
The Calgary South electoral district, covering southeast Calgary, was created in the early 1960s from Calgary-South East, Gleichen and Banff-Cochrane electoral districts. The district was abolished in the 1971 electoral boundary re-distribution to form both Calgary-Egmont and Calgary-Millican electoral districts.

Members of the Legislative Assembly (MLAs)

Election results

1963 general election

1967 general election

See also
List of Alberta provincial electoral districts
South Calgary, Calgary, a neighbourhood in Calgary, Alberta
Calgary South, a defunct federal electoral district in Alberta, Canada
Calgary South East (provincial electoral district), a defunct provincial electoral district in Alberta, Canada
De Winton/South Calgary Airport, an airport south of Calgary, Alberta
South Calgary (provincial electoral district), a defunct provincial electoral district from 1913 to 1921
Calgary Southeast, a federal electoral district

References

Further reading

External links
Elections Alberta
The Legislative Assembly of Alberta

Former provincial electoral districts of Alberta
Politics of Calgary